Nemom Railway Terminal also known as Thiruvananthapuram South Terminal, (Code:NEM) is one of the six railway stations serving the city of Trivandrum which is also proposed to act as the second satellite station to Thiruvananthapuram Central railway station in the state of Kerala, India. Nemom station comes under the Thiruvananthapuram railway division of the Southern Railway zone, Indian Railways.

Train operating centre
Indian Railways have finalized a proposal for setting up an operating centre in Nemom, for trains departing from and terminating at Thiruvananthapuram Central. All coach maintenance activities performed in Thiruvananthapuram Central is proposed to be transferred to Nemom once the operating centre is commissioned. Railways has proposed to set up 10 pit lines for maintenance of 30 trains, 12 stabling lines, sick lines and staff quarters at Nemom.

Proposed new passenger terminal
Thiruvananthapuram thus will become the first city in Kerala to have two satellite stations. Nemom will soon be developed as a full-fledged Passenger Terminus (Coaching Terminal) with 5 platforms and will act as a terminus station for trains coming to Thiruvananthapuram Central, thereby reducing rush/congestion in the station.

An amount of Rs. 77.30 crores have been allotted for the first phase of the new Terminal, as per Shri O. Rajagopal M.L.A., as reported by the media including The Hindu.

This stretch will become the first in the state to have a three-line service.

Extension of proposed Sabari rail line from Erumely via Pathanamthitta, Punalur, Nedumanagadu is expected to connect with proposed Nemom terminal. The station is on the way of renaming to Thiruvananthapuram South Terminal.

See also
 Indian Railways
 Transport in Thiruvananthapuram
 
 Kochuveli railway station
 Thiruvananthapuram Pettah railway station

References

External links
 Indian railways
 Southern railways

Railway stations in Thiruvananthapuram
Thiruvananthapuram railway division
Railway stations opened in 1979